RTV Mostar also known as RTM was a Bosnian local commercial television channel based in Mostar, Bosnia and Herzegovina. The program was mainly produced in Bosnian language. Television channel is launched in 1995 and dissolved in 2018. Local radio station Radio Mostar  is founded in 1992 and it is also part of this company. RTM was co-founder of the first Bosnian television network called Mreža plus.

RTM was active member and one of the founders of the new TV1Mreža 

Mreža TV is a television program with almost national coverage in Bosnia and Herzegovina, and jointly in partnership with TV 1 broadcast several regional public and private TV stations. TV1Mreža airs popular series, movies and sports programs to viewers in BiH.

External links 
 Communications Regulatory Agency of Bosnia and Herzegovina
 RTM Website (under construction)

References 

Mass media in Mostar
Defunct television channels in Bosnia and Herzegovina
Television channels and stations established in 1995